Onchogamasus is a genus of mites in the family Ologamasidae.

Species
 Onchogamasus communis Womersley, 1956
 Onchogamasus heterosetae Karg, 1996
 Onchogamasus pumilio Lee, 1970
 Onchogamasus quasicurtipilus Lee, 1970

References

Ologamasidae